Edwardes is a family name of English origins. It is a variant of Edwards, and means "son of Edward".

People with this surname include:

 Cheryl Edwardes (born 1950), Australian retired politician
 David Edwardes (fl. 1532), English anatomist
 Francis Edwardes (disambiguation), three Edwardes baronets and a Member of Parliament
 George Edwardes (1855–1915), English theatre manager
 Herbert Benjamin Edwardes (1819–1868), English administrator, major-general and statesman
 May de Montravel Edwardes (1887–1967), English painter
 Michael Edwardes (1930–2019), British-South African business executive
 Olga Edwardes (1917–2008) British-South African actress and artist
 Richard Edwardes (1525–1566), English poet, playwright and composer; suspected of being a son of Henry VIII
 Thomas Edwardes (disambiguation), three Edwardes baronets
 William Edwardes (disambiguation), four Barons Kensington

In the Alfred Hitchcock film Spellbound, Gregory Peck's character impersonates murder victim Dr. Anthony Edwardes.

See also
 Edwardes family
 Edwards (disambiguation)

English-language surnames
Surnames of English origin
Patronymic surnames
Surnames from given names